Calilegua is a town and municipality in Jujuy Province in Argentina.

Climate

References

Populated places in Jujuy Province